Gilda Bolt-González (born 5 June 1956) is a Nicaraguan diplomat appointed as Nicaragua's ambassador to the Holy See in 2019.

Background and education 
Bolt-González was born in Matagalpa. She is married and has a daughter. She holds a degree in Social Sciences and a master's degree in Public Policy.

Career 
Bolt-González started her career as head of the formulation of development plans in the Western Region of Nicaragua across several sectors of education, reconstruction, monitoring the efficiency of administrations and anti-corruption control from 1992 to 2000. She served as Director of Institutional Relations in the Contraloría General de la República 2000 to 2006 when she was appointed head of Cabinet of the Ministry of Foreign Affairs. She was Nicaraguan ambassador to El Salvador between 2007 and 2014 before being appointed Deputy Minister of Foreign Affairs, non-resident ambassador in Belize and presidential delegate for Central American Integration serving in this position from 2014 to 2018. In 2019, her posting to Costa Rica as Nicaragua Ambassador was terminated by Nicaragua government after two months of no response from Costa Rica president accepting her to serve there. She was then redeployed to the Holy See and presented her letter of credence to Pope Francis on 4 October 2019.

References 

Living people
1956 births
Nicaraguan diplomats
Nicaraguan women diplomats